Despite the best efforts of the government, health, and environmental agencies, improper use of hazardous chemicals is pervasive in commercial products, and can yield devastating effects, from people developing brittle bones and severe congenital defects, to strips of wildlife laying dead by poisoned rivers.

Agriculture

Insecticides

Mevinphos

A nerve agent 
Mevinphos is a broad spectrum of insecticides that are used on a wide variety of crops, including apples, peaches, strawberries, nectarines, celery, and cucumbers. They belong to the chemical group known as organophosphates, which have neural toxic effects, not in only insecticides, but also in birds, fish, amphibians, and mammals. While not carcinogenic, mevinphos are potent via all means of exposure, including absorption, ingestion, and inhalation. Organophosphates inhibit acetylcholinesterase (AChE), an enzyme responsible for regulating levels of the muscle-stimulating neurotransmitter, acetylcholine (ACh). This results in high levels of acetylcholine levels in the body, which causes nearly every muscle in the body to be stimulated without cessation. Symptoms of organophosphate poisoning include violent convulsions, vomiting, miosis, lachrymation, sweating, salivation, diarrhea, and potentially death.

Most nerve gases, including sarin, soman, and tabun, are organophosphates, which are all banned by the Geneva Convention of 1925, as they are deemed a war crime.

Pesticide poisoning of workers in Salinas Valley, California 
From 1981 to 1984, 1,156 people consisting of field workers and agricultural officials in Salinas Valley, California were reported to have been exposed to mevinphos, developing insecticide-related illnesses. The exposure began on April 23, 1981 when the field was sprayed with mevinphos at 5:00 am that morning, despite a cancellation order having been given the day before. Later that morning at 7:00 am, 44 field workers began harvesting iceberg lettuce on the farm. Two hours later, many of these workers developed symptoms of dizziness, headaches, eye irritation, visual disturbances, and nausea.

Thirty-one farm workers along with three agricultural officials who were in the field that morning were sent to a local hospital to be tested for plasma cholinesterase, which looks at two substances levels that are necessary for the nervous system to work properly. Two workers were kept in the hospital for further observation and treatment due to respiratory complications. Two other people had levels of plasma cholinesterase below normal limit. The rest of the workers were disrobed, hosed down with water, asked to get dressed, go home, and wash their clothes at home. No one was told not to come to work the next day. However, due to ongoing symptoms, many of the workers were not able to report to work the next morning. A union representative arranged for 29 workers to be taken to a second hospital for further testing and evaluation. One person was hospitalized due to bradycardia.

The National Institute for Occupational Safety and Health (NIOSH) began an investigation on April 24 working closely with staff from the second hospital during this acute phase of this incident. The 29 workers reported the following signs and symptoms: “eye irritation (76%), headache (48%), visual disturbances (48%), dizziness (41%), nausea (38%), fatigue (28%), chest pain or shortness of breath (21%), skin irritation (17%), fasciculation of the eyelids (10%), fasciculation of muscles in the arm (7%), excessive sweating (7%), and diarrhea (7%), with twenty-two (76%) of the workers reporting three or more symptoms or signs.”

The workers were tested approximately every week over the course of 8 to 12 weeks.  When initially tested the first week, everyone’s plasm cholinesterase and red blood cell (RBC) cholinesterase was above normal levels. Test levels from the following week increase by 5% and the week after that by 14%. Over the course of time, their levels kept increasing. This is believed to be due to organophosphates inhibiting the enzyme, cholinesterase, resulting in toxic effects by allowing an increase of the neurotransmitter in the nervous system. It is not known how many other cases were not reported and followed from this incident.

Health risk 
Mevinphos is considered among the ten highest health risk posing pesticides and reported to have acute total illnesses in 1984-1990, low oral LD50, and a low Reference Dose (RfD). On February 28, 1994, the California Environmental Protection Agency, Pesticide and Environmental Toxicology Section, recommended the cancellation of mevinphos use in California due to the inability to implement safe mitigative measures and the inability to prevent unacceptable dietary and worker exposures.

Environmental regulation 
All pesticides in the U.S. must be reviewed by the Environmental Protection Agency (EPA), under the regulations of the Federal Insecticide, Fungicide, and Rodenticide Act (FIFRA), at least once every 15 years.

The EPA defines “pesticides” in the FIFRA by four criteria:

1. Claims - The product is claimed or advertised by its distributor as a “pesticide.”

2. Composition - The compound contains at least one active ingredient that has no commercial value besides for pesticidal purposes.

3. Knowledge that the Substances Will Be used as a Pesticide - The distributor has “actual or constructive knowledge” that the product will be used as a pesticide, regardless if the product is not claimed or advertised as one.

4. Plant Growth Regulators - The product is intended to introduce physiological changes to plants that effect their growth in any way.

Commercial and Industrial Use

Radium 
Radium is a radioactive element that is naturally found at low levels in the environment from uranium and thorium decay. It can be found virtually everywhere, including the soil, water, rocks, and flora. As radium is naturally everywhere in the environment, all humans are almost always exposed to radium. At natural levels, radium is quite benign. However, at excessive levels, radium poisoning can occur. When the body takes in radium, it perceives it as calcium. Consequently, the body fills bones with radium, which can lead to brittle bones, collapsed spines, and teeth to fall out.

Radium was discovered in 1898 by Marie and Pierre Curie. In the early 1900s it was used as radiation treatment for cancer. Expansion of radium’s use in medical practices was earnestly attempted in the treatment of rheumatism and mental disorders. However, these pursuits were unsuccessful.

Radium Girls 
Due to radium’s luminescent properties, American inventor William J. Hammer mixed radium with glue and zinc sulfide to make glow-in-the-dark paint. This paint was used by the U.S. Radium Corporation and named “Undark.” The paint was primarily used for wristwatch dials. Further application of the paint reached military equipment after the company accepted a contract with the U.S. government during WWI.

Starting in 1916, the U.S. Radium Corporation established factories in New Jersey that recruited dozens of women to paint the watch dials with Undark. No safety equipment were given to the women, nor were any precautions taken. The women were instructed to frequently lick the paint brushes, in order to keep them wet and shaped to a fine point. Throughout every day, the women’s clothes and skin were covered in radium paint. This led to the women developing fatal radium poisoning.

By the mid-1920s dozens upon dozens of these women were falling ill and dying from prolonged, horrific deaths. The radium they ingested was dissolving their bones from the inside, causing severe pain and enormous deformities with pieces of their bodies easily breaking and falling off. By 1927, over 50 women died from radium poisoning.

A smaller number of these female workers tried suing the company, not only for financial compensation to pay for their large medical bills and to afford themselves income to be able to live out the rest of their lives, but also to expose the company to their wrongful doing. Dial painter, Grace Fryer, as well as four other women sued U.S. Radium for $250,000. However, this lawsuit was unsuccessful because of U.S. Radium’s vast team of lawyers and contractual affiliation with the U.S. government. The women were so desperate to afford medical treatment and food, that they had to settle for $10,000 each and a $600 annual payment. Unfortunately, all five women passed away within two years after the settlement.

The fate of the Radium Girls raised a lot of national concern for workers’ health rights and conditions. After the incident, precautions and safety equipment were mandated to protect workers handling radioactive material in several occupations. The Manhattan Project notably used fume hoods, personal protective equipment, sanitation, and frequent checks for contamination, in order to prevent a repeat of the Radium Girls tragedy. In 1949, the U.S. Congress passed a law that compensates workers for occupational illnesses.

Environmental regulation 
By the time World War II began, safety limits for handling radiation had been set by the federal government.

In 1934, the International Commission on Radiological Protection (ICRP) established a tolerance dose for workers of 0.2 roentgens of radiation exposure to workers per day. In 1936, the National Committee on Radiation Protection and Measurements (NCRP) reduced the limit to 0.1 roentgens per day which held through World War II. From 1936 through 1977 there were continual revisions by professional scientists and the government agencies as to what constituted safe doses. By the end of World War II, arguments between the U.S. military leaders and civilian officials ensued as to what were considered best practices to controlling nuclear energy and repressing fabrication of nuclear weapons by other nations. This led to the dispute in going to congress and resulting in congress passing the Atomic Energy Act (AEA) of 1946.

The EPA was created in 1970 to accept certain functions and responsibilities from other federal agencies and departments. Since its inception, the EPA has run environmental programs that address radioactive waste disposal sites, off-site monitoring around nuclear power plants, and keeps an eye on natural sources of radioactivity, such as radon.

The EPA has developed guidance on topics such as occupational radiation limits and exposures for federal agencies and members of the public. The EPA can offer recommendations on quality assurance programs for nuclear medicine under its FRC-derived authority.

Perfluorooctanoic Acid (PFOA) 
Perfluorooctanoic acid, a.k.a. PFOA or C8, is a synthetic chemical surfactant that is often used in the process of making non-stick cookware. PFOA is extremely bio-persistent, with a half-life of 8 years in humans. PFOA can stay in the environment and the human body over long periods of time, and can have harmful effects to people exposed in high doses.

Clean blood study 
A worldwide study was conducted to compare “clean blood,” i.e., blood without C8 as a control with blood that contains C8, in order to illuminate the hazardous effects on humans. However, “clean blood,” could not be found from participants because 99% across the globe had derivatives of C8 found in their blood. Instead, samples of preserved blood from American Soldiers during the Korean War were used as the control. The blood was obtained in 1950, a year before Teflon was ever sold to the public. None of the preserved blood was found to contain C8, strongly suggesting that the worldwide use of Teflon caused a nigh-ubiquitous absence of “clean blood.”

DuPont and 3M 
PFOA has been used to make Teflon, a non-stick cookware by the chemical company DuPont, since 1951. Fortunately for consumers, it does not exist in significant amounts in the final product of Teflon that could cause noticeable harm upon normal use. However, DuPont and 3M workers that handle PFOA, as well as people who live near the plants, are not as fortunate.

Birth defects 
In 1981, two babies of female workers have been found to have eye-related defects. In 1986, Buck Bailey was born with a single nostril, a serrated eye lid, and a keyhole pupil, due to his mother being exposed to PFOA on a daily basis when she worked at DuPont.

Contamination of drinking water in Parkersburg, WV 
It was not until the early 1990s that the toxic effects of PFOA became a public concern. Wilbur Tennant, a farmer who lives on his own private land near the DuPont plant in Parkersburg, West Virginia, videotaped the calamitous effects of PFOA on his cattle and local wildlife. Calves were born with black teeth and opaque eyes. Several cows and deer were found dead by the stream. As it turned out, DuPont was dumping large amounts of waste PFOA into local streams that fed into Parkersburg's town water supply. So much waste PFOA was dumped that DuPont quickly lost count. Eventually, children were noticed to have black teeth, much like the calves in Tennant's farm.

Phasing out C8 
In 2003, 3M phased out C8 for C4 in attempt to avoid public backlash. They urged DuPont to do the same. Instead, DuPont seized the opportunity to become the sole manufacturer of C8 and increased production. This lasted until the EPA banned the production of C8 in 2013. DuPont soon substituted C8 with Gen-X, which is a chemical that has not yet been researched or regulated. In order to detach their name from the toxic reputation of PFOA's, DuPont created the spin-off company, Chemours, to handle production and continued dumping of Gen-X.

After facing several class-action lawsuits, DuPont paid $43,000 residents of Ohio each $400 to participate in a study to determine whether C8 could be linked to any diseases. Participation in the study also required each person to waive their rights to sue DuPont if no links could be made. The study lasted over seven years and grew to almost 70,000 participants, including West Virginia residents. The results were concluded in 2012. Six diseases were linked: “testicular and kidney cancer, ulcerative colitis, thyroid disease, pre-eclampsia, and high cholesterol.”

DuPont's public relations with Parkersburg, WV 
Part of the reason it has been difficult for residents of Parkersburg, West Virginia to challenge DuPont is because the chemical company makes large contributions to the local economy, education system, and local government. There are even buildings and a street named after DuPont.

Environmental regulation 
PFOA is a group of chemicals that are still being studied. To date EPA has not yet established statutory clean-up levels for PFOA. However, the agency has established health advisory levels for these substances based on EPA’s assessment of the latest peer-reviewed science. This advisory is meant to provide states, tribal and local officials, and drinking water system operators, information on the health risks due to these chemicals in order to enable these people to take appropriate measures to protect their communities. EPA has established a health advisory number of 70 parts per trillion for PFOA in drinking water to provide a conservative margin of protection to the most sensitive populations, thus ensuring protection for everyone.

References

Regulation of chemicals